The leopard (Panthera pardus) is one of the five "big cats" in the genus Panthera.

Leopard may also refer to:

Biology
 Amur leopard (Panthera pardus orientalis), related species of Northeast Asia
 Snow leopard or ounce (Panthera uncia), related species of Central Asia
 Clouded leopard (Neofelis nebulosa), related species of South/Southeast Asia
 Sunda clouded leopard (Neofelis diardi), related species of Sumatra and Borneo
 Leopard cat (Prionailurus bengalensis), wildcat species of Southeast Asia
 Leopard (pattern), the spotting pattern characteristic of Leopards
 Leopard complex, the genetic allele responsible for leopard-spotting in horses
 LEOPARD syndrome, a rare autosomal dominant multisystem disease, associated with high numbers of surface skin lesions

Military
 VK 16.02 Leopard, a German light tank design during World War II that did not see production.
 Leopard 1, a German main battle tank (1965-)
 Leopard 2, a third-generation German  main battle tank (1979-), used by the armed forces of Germany and several other countries
 Leopard 2E or Leopardo 2A6E, a Spanish variant of the German Leopard 2 tank.
 Leopard (rocket), a British rocket
 HMS Leopard, several Royal Navy ships
 French destroyer Léopard, a warship of World War II
 SMS Leopard, an Austro-Hungarian torpedo cruiser

Transportation
 South Devon Railway Leopard class, a South Devon Railway 4-4-0ST steam locomotive, and the class of similar locomotives
 Leopard 6 Litre Roadster, luxury car designed by Polish designer for Sweden-based company
 Nissan Leopard, Japanese luxury sports car
 Leyland Leopard, a bus
 SS Leopard, one of the blockade runners of the American Civil War
 CMC Leopard, a defunct British light personal business jet developed in the 1980s as two prototypes

Computing
 Mac OS X Leopard, the sixth major release of Apple's Mac OS X operating system
 DR-DOS, code-name "Leopard" of Digital Research's DR DOS 5.0

Other uses
 Leopard (heraldry), a heraldic beast
 Leopard-Trek, the former name of a UCI WorldTour cycling team, now known as Trek Factory Racing
 Leopard Development Team, a UCI Continental cycling team
 Half Florin or Leopard, English coin of Edward III 
 Leopard, a locally monthly magazine based in Aberdeen, Scotland

See also
 Leopardus, a genus of small spotted cats
 Leopards (disambiguation)
 Leopardi (disambiguation)
 The Leopard (disambiguation)
 The Leopard (1963 film), by Luchino Visconti

Animal common name disambiguation pages